Euskalmet (in Basque: Euskal Meteorologia Agentzia, English: Basque Agency of Meteorology) is the Basque service of meteorology, established in 1990.

References

External links
  (can be viewed both in Basque and Spanish)

Governmental meteorological agencies in Europe
Basque Government